George Washington Kramer (1847–1938) was an American architect.
He worked both independently and in the partnership of Weary & Kramer with Frank O. Weary.

Biography
George W. Kramer was born in Ashland, Ohio on July 9, 1847.

He retired in 1924, and died at his home in East Orange, New Jersey on October 20, 1938.

Works
A number of his works are listed on the National Register of Historic Places, including:

Andrews United Methodist Church, 95 Richmond St. Brooklyn, New York
Baptist Temple, 360 Schermerhorn St. Brooklyn, New York
Bay Ridge United Methodist Church, 7002 Fourth St. Brooklyn, New York
One or more works in Birmingham Green Historic District, roughly bounded by Fifth, Caroline, Fourth and Olivia Sts. Derby, Connecticut
Duke Memorial United Methodist Church, 504 W. Chapel Hill St. Durham, North Carolina
One or more works in Findlay Downtown Historic District, roughly along Main, W. Sandusky and W. Main Cross Sts. Findlay, Ohio
First United Methodist Church, 6th Ave. and 19th St., N Birmingham, Alabama
First United Methodist Church, jct. of Prince and Clifton Sts., NW corner Conway, Arkansas
First United Methodist Church, 226 E. Lincoln Ave. Mount Vernon, New York
Second Presbyterian Church, 801 Waller St. Portsmouth, Ohio
St. Luke's Methodist Episcopal Church, 1199 Main St. Dubuque, Iowa
St. Paul's Methodist Episcopal Church, 1886-1906 Park St. Hartford, Connecticut

Other works
First St. John Methodist Church, 1601 Clay St. San Francisco, California. Demolished May 16, 2014.

References

Architects from Ohio
Architects from New York City
1847 births
1938 deaths